The Arab Democratic Nasserist Party is a Nasserist political party in Egypt, styling itself as the ideological successor of the old Arab Socialist Union party of Egypt's second president, Gamal Abdel Nasser.

At the 2000 parliamentary elections, the party won three out of 454 seats. However, at the 2005 and 2010 elections, the party failed to win any seats. At the 2015 election, the party won one seat.

Al Arabi, a weekly newspaper, is the organ of the party.

History 
The economic liberalizations, and foreign policy changes implemented by  Nasser's successor as president, Anwar El Sadat, alienated many ideological Nasserists in the late 1970s and early 1980s. One illegal group, the Thawrat Misri, or Egyptian Revolution was formed in 1980. After it was broken up by the government, several of Nasser's relatives were shown to be involved.

Ideological Nasserists gravitated to either the Socialist Labor Party or the National Progressive Unionist Party (NPUF) throughout the rest of the decade. They were finally allowed to have an open legal party, the Arab Democratic Nasserist Party, led by Diya al-din Dawud, on 19 April 1992.

Platform 
The party platform calls for:
 Social change towards progress and development.
 Defence and freedom of national will.
 Renouncing violence and combating terrorism.
 Protecting public freedoms.
 Enhancing the role of the public sector.
 Modernizing the Egyptian industries.
 Developing the agriculture sector.
 Encouraging inter-Arab economic integration.
 Providing free-of-charge medical treatment for citizens.
 Promoting peace in the world arena.

References

Further reading
Political Parties of the Middle East and North Africa Frank Tachau Ed. Westport Conn: Greenwood Press 1994

1992 establishments in Egypt
Arab nationalism in Egypt
Nasserist political parties
Nationalist parties in Egypt
Pan-Arabist political parties
Political parties established in 1992
Socialist parties in Egypt